Rory Kramer is an American photographer and filmmaker best known for directing music videos and his MTV show Dare to Live.

Early life
Kramer was raised in Tell City, Indiana. His family owns a home in Clear Lake, Indiana.

Career
When he was 25, Kramer moved to Los Angeles, California, to pursue a career in acting. He began working as a content quality controller for streaming services. After living in Los Angeles for about four years, Kramer began making small YouTube videos of his adventures. A friend offered Kramer a job touring with 3LAU and making videos of 3LAU's performances. Later, Kramer made a music video for Avicii for the song "The Nights" and toured with Martin Garrix.

In 2016, Kramer directed the lyric video for The Chainsmokers' song "Closer". The video reached one billion views on January 10, 2017. On February 4, 2018, the video reached two billion views, making it the first lyric video ever to have this many views. By September 2021, it was the 30th most-viewed video of all time, and the most viewed lyric video of all time with over 2.7 billion views on YouTube.

In 2017, Kramer starred in an MTV show, Dare to Live, which followed Kramer as he went with various celebrities on adventures. In 2020, Kramer co-directed the music video for Stuck with U, a duet by Justin Bieber and Ariana Grande that won an MTV Award.

On January 14, 2021, Kramer took 3,500 photos of Justin Bieber in three locations across Los Angeles. A photo showing Bieber crouched in Downtown Los Angeles' 2nd Street Tunnel became the cover photo for Bieber's 2021 album Justice.

Awards
 MTV's Moon Man Award for 2020 Best Music Video From Home

Personal life
In July 2018, Kramer was driving his car and speeding on loose gravel when he lost control of the vehicle which spun out, hit a tree, and flipped upside down. His car was totaled and Kramer stated that a speaker in his car prevented the car from crushing him and saved his life. Following the accident, Kramer posted to his Instagram account, stating that he was struggling with anxiety, depression, and his father's diagnosis with cancer, which had led to Kramer's reckless behavior.

Kramer married Amy Disser on August 22, 2020 in Clear Lake, Indiana.

Videography

As television actor

Music videos

External links

References

American photographers
American filmmakers
Living people
Year of birth missing (living people)